Christopher Holt (born June 5, 1985) is a Canadian-born American former professional hockey goaltender who last played with the Braehead Clan of the Elite Ice Hockey League. He also played for the New York Rangers and St. Louis Blues of the National Hockey League, Dinamo Riga, HC Donbass of the Kontinental Hockey League and Orli Znojmo of the Austrian Hockey League.

Playing career
Holt was drafted 180th overall in the 2003 NHL Entry Draft by the New York Rangers. Holt was first called up from the Hartford Wolf Pack of the American Hockey League (AHL) in December 2005 as backup to Henrik Lundqvist while starting goalie Kevin Weekes was injured. He played just over 10 minutes in one game, not allowing a goal becoming the first former Billings Bulls player to play in the NHL. He was sent back down to Hartford but was recalled to the Rangers on February 23, 2006.

On October 30, 2008, Holt was signed as a free agent by the St. Louis Blues after playing two games for their affiliate the Peoria Rivermen. On October 31, Holt was called up to the Blues on emergency before returning to Peoria. He was again recalled by the Blues on February 6, 2009. He made his first appearance for the Blues, and only his second appearance in the NHL on February 18, 2009 as a replacement for Chris Mason after Mason started the first two periods against the Columbus Blue Jackets, totaling 19 min., giving up no goals on three shots.

In September 2009, prior to the 2009–10 season, he attended the Ottawa Senators training camp. He was demoted to the Binghamton Senators organization which demoted him to the Elmira Jackals on September 30. He was promoted to Binghamton in March 2010. On March 19, 2010, he became the tenth goaltender in AHL history to score a goal, and the sixth to score it by shooting the puck himself. Holt scored on the Rochester Americans while the Americans goalie was pulled for a sixth attacker. In June 2010, it was announced that Holt has signed a two-year deal with the Kontinental Hockey League club Dinamo Riga.

On June 29, 2012, Holt signed a free agent deal with fellow KHL club, Avtomobilist Yekaterinburg. After appearing in 27 games for only 4 wins with the cellar-dwelling Avtomobilist, Holt was traded to HC Donbass for their playoff push to end the 2012–13 season on January 10, 2013.

International play
Despite his Canadian birth, Holt is an American citizen due to his mother being a native of California. He has represented the USA at the 2003 World Junior Championships on the US Under-18 National Team.

On October 20, 2011, he was selected as one of two goalies on the 21-man roster for the 2011 U.S. Men's Select Team that will compete at the Deutschland Cup from November 11–13 in Munich, Germany.

Career statistics

Regular season and playoffs

International

References

External links

1985 births
Living people
Alaska Aces (ECHL) players
American men's ice hockey goaltenders
Avtomobilist Yekaterinburg players
Binghamton Senators players
Braehead Clan players
Canadian emigrants to the United States
Canadian ice hockey goaltenders
Charlotte Checkers (1993–2010) players
Dinamo Riga players
Elmira Jackals (ECHL) players
Hartford Wolf Pack players
HC Donbass players
New York Rangers draft picks
New York Rangers players
Omaha Mavericks men's ice hockey players
Peoria Rivermen (AHL) players
St. Louis Blues players
Ice hockey people from Vancouver
USA Hockey National Team Development Program players
Canadian expatriate ice hockey players in Italy
Canadian expatriate ice hockey players in Scotland
Canadian expatriate ice hockey players in Ukraine
Canadian expatriate ice hockey players in Latvia
Canadian expatriate ice hockey players in Russia
Canadian expatriate ice hockey players in the Czech Republic
American expatriate ice hockey players in Italy
American expatriate ice hockey players in Scotland
American expatriate ice hockey players in Ukraine
American expatriate ice hockey players in Latvia
American expatriate ice hockey players in Russia
American expatriate ice hockey players in the Czech Republic